Carlos Luis Campos (born 27 September 1980 in Guco) is a light flyweight boxer from Venezuela, who won the bronze medal in the men's light flyweight division (– 48 kg) at the 2002 Central American and Caribbean Games in El Salvador. He made his professional debut on 18 April 2004.

References

External links
 

1980 births
Living people
Central American and Caribbean Games bronze medalists for Venezuela
Competitors at the 2002 Central American and Caribbean Games
Competitors at the 2002 South American Games
Flyweight boxers
South American Games silver medalists for Venezuela
South American Games medalists in boxing
Venezuelan male boxers
Central American and Caribbean Games medalists in boxing
20th-century Venezuelan people
21st-century Venezuelan people